Trigonotretidae is an extinct family of articulate brachiopods belonging to the order Spiriferida.

These stationary epifaunal suspension feeders lived in the Carboniferous and Permian periods, from 360.7 to 252.3 Ma.

Genera
Aperispirifer Waterhouse, 1968
Betaneospirifer Gatinaud, 1949
Blasispirifer Kulikov, 1950
Brachythyrinella
Cartorhium Cooper and Grant, 1976
Costatispirifer Archbold and Thomas, 1985
Crassispirifer Archbold and Thomas, 1985
Cratispirifer Archbold and Thomas, 1985
Fasciculatia Waterhouse, 2004
Frechella
Fusispirifer Waterhouse, 1966
Gibbospirifer Waterhouse, 1971
Gypospirifer Cooper and Grant, 1976
Imperiospira Archbold and Thomas, 1993
Kaninospirifer
Lepidospirifer Cooper and Grant, 1969
Neospirifer Fredericks, 1919
Occidalia Archbold, 1997
Pondospirifer Waterhouse, 1978
Quadrospira Archbold, 1997
Saltospirifer Cisterna and Archbold, 2007
Septospirifer Waterhouse, 1971
Sulciplica Waterhouse, 1968
Trigonotreta Koenig, 1825

References 

Prehistoric protostome families
Brachiopod families
Spiriferida
Carboniferous first appearances
Permian extinctions